AECO Records is a record label started by the Art Ensemble Of Chicago.

Discography
 AECO 001: Don Moye – Sun Percussion Volume One
 AECO 002: Joseph Jarman – Sunbound Volume One
 AECO 003: Brother Malachi Favors Magoustous – Natural and the Spiritual
 AECO 004: Art Ensemble of Chicago – Kabalaba
 AECO 007: Don Moye – Jam for Your Life!
 AECO 008: Art Ensemble of Chicago and Don Pullen – Fundamental Destiny 
 AECO 012: Art Ensemble of Chicago – Salutes the Chicago Blues Tradition
 AECO 3009: Don Moye & Enoch Williamson – Afrikan Song

References

American record labels
Jazz record labels